The Millionaire's Club was a professional wrestling stable in World Championship Wrestling (WCW) in 2000.

History 
In early 2000, WCW decided that Kevin Sullivan's booking style was not as successful as they had hoped. So, they decided to bring back former WCW president Eric Bischoff and former head of creativity Vince Russo, putting them together to run WCW with the thought that they could keep each other's failures in check.

On-screen, Bischoff and Russo took over and declared all WCW championships vacant on April 10, 2000. They also declared a new stable with both of them at the helm called The New Blood. It consisted of most of the younger, up-and-coming wrestlers in WCW along with longtime talent that had never been pushed for years.  Their main enemies became known as the Millionaire's Club, the older veteran stars of the company who they claimed held back the younger talent. The idea was to get the younger talent over and generate more interest among the younger fans that watched the World Wrestling Federation (WWF) instead of WCW, although it later evolved into a New World Order (nWo) rehash. Many argue that a primary reason the WWF defeated WCW in the Monday Night Wars is because they greatly put over new talent rather than relying so heavily on long-established veterans. As such, this was seen as an overly extreme and late attempt at that strategy.

On April 16, 2000, at Spring Stampede in Chicago, Illinois, all of the titles were filled with matches between the New Blood and the Millionaire's Club. The feuds continued for another month or so before both factions disbanded due to WCW management deciding the angle was not working due to it backfiring, as the Millionaire's Club got most of the positive fan reaction.

The true end of the angle occurred on July 9 at Bash at the Beach, after Russo's infamous worked shoot promo, which caused Hulk Hogan and Bischoff to leave the promotion.

Members 

One night only. May 17th WCW Thunder
 Terry Funk
 Chavo Guerrero
 Van Hammer
 Diamond Dallas Page
 Hugh Morris
 Booker T
 Sting
 Miss Elizabeth (manager)

 Associates of the Millionaire's Club
 Booker T
 Goldberg
 Randy Savage
 Jim Duggan
 Kronik
 Scott Steiner
 Misfits In Action (feuding with The Filthy Animals)
 Chris Kanyon
 Terry Funk
 Horace Hogan
 Mean Gene Okerlund

Championships and accomplishments 
 World Championship Wrestling
 WCW Cruiserweight Championship (1 time) – Lt. Loco
 WCW Hardcore Championship (2 times) – Terry Funk
 WCW World Heavyweight Championship (5 times) – Ric Flair (2), Kevin Nash (1), Sid Vicious (1), Diamond Dallas Page (1)
 WCW World Tag Team Championship (1 time) – Kronik

References 

World Championship Wrestling teams and stables
Hulk Hogan